Manning is an unincorporated community in Scott County, Kansas, United States.

History
A post office was opened in Manning on December 20, 1887, and remained in operation until it was discontinued on June 30, 1955.

References

Further reading

External links
 Scott County maps: Current, Historic, KDOT

Unincorporated communities in Scott County, Kansas
Unincorporated communities in Kansas